The Miraculous Draught of Fishes is a circa 1618–1620 oil painting depicting a New Testament episode,  by the Flemish artist Jacob Jordaens. It is on display in the Musée des Beaux-Arts of Strasbourg, France. Its inventory number is 618.

The painting was long assumed to be by Peter Paul Rubens, who had treated similar subjects involving the fisherman Simon Peter. Wilhelm von Bode bought it as a Rubens (in London, in 1911), and the Rubens specialist Justus Müller-Hofstede confirmed that attribution in 1969. Only in 1977 did a consensus emerge among art historians that the painting is a work from the end of the early period of the long-lived Jacob Jordaens's career. This was established on compositional as well as chromatic grounds.

The purpose of the painting has never been satisfactorily established. It is too large for an oil sketch, and too rough for an official commission. It may be a modello for a lost, larger and more polished painting, or for a tapestry. It could also have been destined for a predella.

References

External links 

La Pêche miraculeuse , presentation on the museum's website

Paintings in the collection of the Musée des Beaux-Arts de Strasbourg
Paintings by Jacob Jordaens
1610s paintings
Paintings depicting Saint Peter
Baroque paintings
Fish in art